The Saldanha Bay Local Municipality consists of twenty-seven members elected by mixed-member proportional representation. Fourteen councillors are elected by first-past-the-post voting in fourteen wards, while the remaining thirteen are chosen from party lists so that the total number of party representatives is proportional to the number of votes received. In the election of 1 November 2021 the Democratic Alliance (DA) obtained a plurality of thirteen seats on the council.

Results 
The following table shows the composition of the council after past elections.

December 2000 election

The following table shows the results of the 2000 election.

October 2002 floor crossing

In terms of the Eighth Amendment of the Constitution and the judgment of the Constitutional Court in United Democratic Movement v President of the Republic of South Africa and Others, in the period from 8–22 October 2002 councillors had the opportunity to cross the floor to a different political party without losing their seats. In the Saldanha Bay council the Democratic Alliance (DA) lost two councillors to the New National Party (NNP), which had formerly been part of the DA.

September 2004 floor crossing
Another floor-crossing period occurred on 1–15 September 2004. The independent councillor joined the United Democratic Movement.

March 2006 election

The following table shows the results of the 2006 election.

By-elections from March 2006 to August 2007
The following by-elections were held to fill vacant ward seats in the period between the election in March 2006 and the floor crossing period in September 2007.

September 2007 floor crossing
The final floor-crossing period occurred on 1–15 September 2007; floor-crossing was subsequently abolished in 2008 by the Fifteenth Amendment of the Constitution. In the Saldanha Bay council, two of the independent councillors joined the African National Congress, and the single councillor from the United Independent Front crossed to the National People's Party.

May 2011 election

The following table shows the results of the 2011 election.

By-elections from May 2011 to August 2016
The following by-elections were held to fill vacant ward seats in the period between the elections in May 2011 and August 2016.

August 2016 election

The following table shows the results of the 2016 election.

By-elections from August 2016 to November 2021 
The following by-elections were held to fill vacant ward seats in the period between the elections in August 2016 and November 2021.

November 2021 election

The following table shows the results of the 2021 election.

Notes

References

Saldanha Bay
Elections in the Western Cape